Catastia uniformalis is a species of snout moth in the genus Catastia. It was described by George Hampson in 1903. It is found in India.

References

Moths described in 1888
Phycitini